The Voyage of the Sable Keech is a 2006 science fiction novel by Neal Asher.  It is the second novel in the Spatterjay sequence.

2006 British novels
2006 science fiction novels
British science fiction novels
Tor Books books